In linguistics, the ornative case is a noun case that means "endowed with" or "supplied with".

This case is found in Dumi, which marks it by the suffix -mi.

In Swahili,  is the ornative case particle. It takes a prefix dependent on the noun class of the head (preceding) noun and is followed by another noun, in expressions such as  meaning "a house having one room".

Similar derivations 
In Hungarian, it is not considered as a case, but as an adjective-forming derivation, marked with the suffix -s (with the variants -os, -as, -es, -ös after a consonant). For example, "ajtó" ("door"), as in "zöld ajtós ház" ("a house with a green door"); "hálószoba" ("bedroom"), as in "2 hálószobás lakás" ("apartment with 2 bedrooms").

See also 
 Comitative case

References

Grammatical cases